The Ghost Flower is a lost 1918 silent film drama directed by Frank Borzage and starring Alma Rubens.



Plot

Cast
Alma Rubens as Giulia
Charles West as La Farge
Francis McDonald as Tony Cafarelli
Richard Rosson as Paola
Emory Johnson as Duke De Chaumont
Naida Lessing as La serena
Tote Du Crow as Ercolano

References

External links
The Ghost Flower at IMDb.com

1918 films
American silent feature films
Films directed by Frank Borzage
Triangle Film Corporation films
Lost American films
American black-and-white films
Silent American drama films
1918 drama films
1918 lost films
Lost drama films
1910s American films